Remote work, also called work from home (WFH), work from anywhere, telework, remote job, mobile work, and distance work is an employment arrangement in which employees do not commute to a central place of work, such as an office building, warehouse, or retail store. Instead, work can be accomplished in the home, such as in a study, a small office/home office and/or a telecentre. A company in which all workers perform remote work is known as a distributed company.

History
In the early 1970s, technology was developed that linked satellite offices to downtown mainframes through dumb terminals using telephone lines as a network bridge. The terms "telecommuting" and "telework" were coined by Jack Nilles in 1973. In 1979, five IBM employees were allowed to work from home as an experiment. By 1983, the experiment was expanded to 2,000 people. By the early 1980s, branch offices and home workers were able to connect to organizational mainframes using personal computers and terminal emulators.

In 1995, the motto that "work is something you do, not something you travel to" was coined. Variations of this motto include: "Work is what we do, not where we are." During the Information Age, many startups were founded in the houses of entrepreneurs who lacked financial resources.

In 1996, the Home Work Convention, an International Labour Organization (ILO) Convention, was created to offer protection to workers who are employed in their own homes.

Since the 1980s, the normalization of remote work has been on a steady incline. For example, the number of Americans working from home grew by 4 million from 2003 to 2006, and by 1983 academics were beginning to experiment with online conferencing.

In the 1990s and 2000s, remote work became facilitated by technology such as collaborative software, virtual private networks, conference calling, videotelephony, internet access, cloud computing, voice over IP (VoIP), mobile telecommunications technology such as a Wi-Fi-equipped laptop or tablet computers, smartphones, and desktop computers, using software such as Zoom, Webex, Microsoft Teams, Google Meet, Slack, and WhatsApp.

In his 1992 travelogue Exploring the Internet, Carl Malamud described a "digital nomad" who "travels the world with a laptop, setting up FidoNet nodes." In 1993, Random House published the Digital Nomad's Guide series of guidebooks by Mitch Ratcliffe and Andrew Gore. The guidebooks, PowerBook, AT&T EO Personal Communicator, and Newton's Law, used the term "digital nomad" to refer to the increased mobility and more powerful communication and productivity technologies that facilitated remote work.

European hacker spaces of the 1990s led to coworking; the first such space opened in 2005.

In 2010, the Telework Enhancement Act of 2010 required each Executive agency in the United States to establish policy allowing remote work to the maximum extent possible, so long as employee performance is not diminished.

During the COVID-19 pandemic, millions of workers began remote work for the first time. Cities in which the population of remote workers increased significantly were referred to as Zoom towns.

Statistics

According to a Gallup poll in September 2021, 45% of full-time U.S. employees worked from home, including 25% who worked from home all of the time and 20% who worked from home part of the time.

In 2020, 12.3% of employed persons, including 13.2% of women and 11.5% of men, in the European Union who were aged 15–64, usually worked from home. By country, the percentage of workers that worked from home was highest in Finland (25.1%), Luxembourg (23.1%), Ireland (21.5%), Austria (18.1%), and the Netherlands (17.8%) and lowest in Bulgaria (1.2%), Romania (2.5%), Croatia (3.1%), Hungary (3.6%), and Latvia (4.5%).

In 2021, in the US 91% of people who work from home said they would like to continue to work remotely in the future. In Gallup's September 2021 study, 54% of workers said they believed that their company's culture would be unchanged by remote work, while 12% believed it would improve and 33% predicted it would deteriorate.

Gallup found in November 2022 that, among remote-capable employees in the U.S., 21% worked on-site, 26% exclusively remote and 53% hybrid.

According to the United States Office of Personnel Management, in fiscal 2020, 50% of all U.S. federal workers were eligible to work remotely and agencies saved more than $180 million because of remote work in fiscal 2020.

In 2023, economist and telework expert Nicholas Bloom said about a third of all working days are remote, slashing corporate real estate expenditures, and up from 5% before the pandemic. Bloom believes quickly progressing technology has facilitated and will continue the trend, but drawbacks for some kinds of positions will remain.

Potential benefits

Cost reduction
Remote work can reduce costs for organizations, including the cost of office space and related expenses such as parking, computer equipment, furniture, office supplies, lighting and heating, ventilation, and air conditioning. Certain employee expenses, such as office expenses, can be shifted to the remote worker, although this is the subject of lawsuits.

Remote work also reduces costs for the worker such as costs of travel/commuting and clothing. It also allows for the possibility of living in a cheaper area than that of the office.

Higher employee motivation and job satisfaction due to autonomy and flexibility
Consistent with job characteristic theory (1976), an increase in autonomy and feedback for employees leads to higher work motivation, satisfaction with personal growth opportunities, general job satisfaction, higher job performance, and lower absenteeism and turnover. Autonomy increased remote workers' satisfaction by reducing work-family conflicts, especially when workers were allowed to work outside traditional work hours and be more flexible for family purposes. Autonomy was the reason for an increase in employee engagement when the amount of time spent remote working increased. Remote workers have more flexibility and can shift work to different times of day and different locations to maximize their performance. The autonomy of remote work allows for arrangement of work to reduce work-family conflict and conflicts with recreational activities. However, studies also show that autonomy must be balanced with high levels of discipline if a healthy work/leisure balance is to be maintained.

Remote work may make it easier for workers to balance their work responsibilities with their personal life and family roles such as caring for children or elderly parents. Remote work improves efficiency by reducing travel time, and reduces commuting time and time stuck in traffic congestion, improving quality of life.

Providing the option to work remotely or adopting a hybrid work schedule has been an incentivizing benefit companies used in new hiring.

Hybrid is a flexible work model that allows employees to split their time between working in the office and working from home.

A 2007 meta-analysis of 46 studies of remote work involving 12,833 employees conducted by Ravi Gajendran and David A. Harrison in the Journal of Applied Psychology, published by the American Psychological Association (APA), found that remote work has largely positive effects on employees' job satisfaction, perceived autonomy, stress levels, manager-rated job performance, and (lower) work-family conflict, and lower turnover intention.

Environmental benefits

Remote work can reduce traffic congestion and air pollution, with fewer cars on the roads.

Most studies find that remote work overall results in: a decrease in energy use due to less time spent on energy-intensive personal transportation, cleaner air, and a reduction of electricity usage due to a lower office space footprint.

During the COVID-19 lockdowns, the increase in remote work led to a decrease in global CO2 emissions. Partially due to the decrease in car commuting, carbon emissions dropped by 5.4%, however emissions immediately increased to the same rate in the following year.

The increase in remote work had also led to people moving out of cities and into larger homes which catered for home office space.

Increased productivity
Remote work has long been promoted as a way to substantially increase employee productivity. A 2013 study showed a 13% increase in productivity among remotely working call-center employees at a Chinese travel agency. An analysis of data collected through March 2021 found that nearly six out of 10 workers reported being more productive working from home than they expected to be, compared with 14% who said they got less done.

Since work hours are less regulated in remote work, employee effort and dedication are far more likely to be measured purely in terms of output or results. However, traces of non-productive work activities (such as: research, self-training, dealing with technical problems or equipment failures), and time lost on unsuccessful attempts (such as: early drafts, fruitless endeavors, abortive innovations), are visible to employers. 

Remote work improves efficiency by reducing or eliminating employees commute time, thus increasing their availability to work. In addition, remote work also helps employees achieve a better work-life balance.

An increase in productivity is also supported by sociotechnical systems (STS) theory (1951), which states that, unless absolutely essential, there should be minimal specification of objectives and how to do tasks in order to avoid inhibiting options or effective actions. Remote work provides workers with the freedom and power to decide how and when to do their tasks and therefore can increase productivity.

At least 50% of employers believe remote work reduces absenteeism. About 56% of employee have reduced absences and use less than 50% of fewer sick days. Overall 75% of employees indicate they have a better work life balance.

Lower turnover intention and higher loyalty
Turnover intention, or the desire to leave an organization, is lower for remote workers. Remote workers who experienced greater professional isolation actually had lower turnover intention.

A 2017 study showed that companies that offered remote work options experienced a 25% lower turnover rate.

Surveys by FlexJobs found that 81% of respondents said they would be more loyal to their employers if they had flexible work options. In a 2021 study by McKinsey & Company, more than half of the workers supported companies adopting a hybrid work model, and more than a quarter stated that they would consider switching jobs if their current employer eliminated remote work options.

A 2021 employee survey report preferring a more flexible working model. During the COVID-19 pandemic the working model showed the amount of employees who are working fully on site is 62%, with 30% Hybrid and 8% remote. Post COVID-19 pandemic working models changed with the amount of employees who were fully on site is 37%, with 52% Hybrid and 11% are remote.

Access to more employees / employers
Remote work allows employees and employers to be matched despite major location differences.

Working responsibility is given to the employee is skilled in that area of work.

Relocation opportunity 
Remote workers may have the opportunity to relocate to another city or state for potential job opportunities and or lower cost of living. A 2020 survey found that 2.4% of people or 4.9 million Americans say they have moved because of remote work in 2020.

Potential drawbacks and concerns

Drawbacks due to reduced face-to-face interactions 
The technology to communicate is not advanced enough to replicate face-to-face office interactions. Room for mistakes and miscommunication can increase. According to media richness theory (1986), face-to-face interactions provide the capacity to process rich information: ambiguous issues can be clarified, immediate feedback can be provided, and there is personalized communication (e.g. body language, tone of voice).

Remote work requires the use of various types of media to communicate, such as videotelephony, telephone, and email, which have drawbacks such as time lags, or ease of deciphering emotions and can reduce the speed and ease at which decisions are made. Asynchronous communication tends to be more difficult to manage and requires much greater coordination than synchronous communication. A phenomenon of "Zoom fatigue" has set in with amount of video meetings popularized by remote working. There have been four causes identified: The size of the faces on the screen and amount of eye contact required, looking at yourself during the video call is tiring, remaining still during the video call to stay in the screen, and communicating without gestures and non-verbal cues.

Face-to-face interactions increase interpersonal contact, connectedness, and trust.

In a 2012 study, 54% of remote workers thought they lost out on social interaction and 52.5% felt they lost out on professional interaction.

Remote working can hurt working relationships between remote workers and their coworkers, especially if their coworkers do not work remotely. Coworkers who do not work  remotely can feel resentful and jealous because they may consider it unfair if they are not allowed to work remotely as well. Remote workers miss out on in person companionship and  do not benefit from on-site perks.

Adaptive structuration theory studies variations in organizations as new technologies are introduced Adaptive structural theory proposes that structures (general rules and resources offered by the technology) can differ from structuration (how people actually use these rules and resources). There is an interplay between the intended use of technology and the way that people use the technology. Remote work provides a social structure that enables and constrains certain interactions. For instance, in office settings, the norm may be to interact with others face-to-face. To accomplish interpersonal exchange in remote work, other forms of interaction need to be used. AST suggests that when technologies are used over time, the rules and resources for social interactions will change. Remote work may alter traditional work practices, such as switching from primarily face-to-face communication to electronic communication.

Sharing information within an organization and teams can become more challenging when working remotely. While in the office, teams naturally share information and knowledge when they meet each other, for example, during coffee breaks. Sharing information requires more effort and proactive action when random-encounters do not happen. The sharing of tacit information also often takes place in unplanned situations where employees follow the activities of more experienced team members.

With remote work, it may also be difficult to obtain timely information, unless the regular sharing of information is taken care of separately. The situation where team members don't know enough about what others are doing can lead them to make worse decisions or slow down decision-making.

From an anthropological perspective, remote work can interfere with the process of sensemaking, the forging of consensus or of a common worldview, which involves absorbing a wide range of signals.

Feedback increases employees' knowledge of results. Feedback refers to the degree that an individual receives direct and clear information about his or her performance related to work activities. Feedback is particularly important so that the employees continuously learn about how they are performing. Electronic communication provides fewer cues for remote workers and thus, they may have more difficulties interpreting and gaining information, and subsequently, receiving feedback. When a worker is not in the office, there is limited information and greater ambiguity, such as in assignments and expectations. Role ambiguity, when situations have unclear expectations as to what the worker is to do, may result in greater conflict, frustration, and exhaustion. In other studies regarding Job Characteristics Theory, job feedback seemed to have the strongest relationship with overall job satisfaction compared to other job characteristics. While remote working, communication is not as immediate or rich as face-to-face interactions. Less feedback when remote working is associated with lower job engagement. Thus, when perceived supervisor support and relationship quality between leaders and remote workers decreases, job satisfaction of the remote worker decreases. The importance of manager communication with remote workers is made clear in a study that found that individuals have lower job satisfaction when their managers remote work. The clarity, speed of response, richness of the communication, frequency, and quality of the feedback are often reduced when managers remote work. Although the level of communication may decrease for remote workers, satisfaction with this level of communication can be higher for those who are more tenured and have functional instead of social relationships or those that have certain personalities and temperaments.

Social information processing suggests that individuals give meaning to job characteristics. Individuals have the ability to construct their own perception of the environment by interpreting social cues. This social information comes from overt statements from coworkers, cognitive evaluations of the job or task dimensions, and previous behaviors. This social context can affect individuals' beliefs about the nature of the job, the expectations for individual behavior, and the potential consequences of behavior, especially in uncertain situations. In remote work, there are fewer social cues because social exchange and personalized communication takes longer to process in computer-mediated communication than face-to-face interactions.

Lessened work motivation
Skill variety has the strongest relationship with internal work motivation. Jobs that allow workers to use a variety of skills increase workers' internal work motivation. If remote workers are limited in teamwork opportunities and have fewer opportunities to use a variety of skills, they may have lower internal motivation towards their work. Also, perceived social isolation can lead to less motivation.

Motivator-hygiene theory differentiates between motivating factors (motivators) and dissatisfying factors (hygienes). Factors that are motivators such as recognition and career advancement may be lessened with remote work. When remote workers are not physically present, they may be "out of sight, out of mind" to other workers in the office.

Not being in the office face-to-face can lead to workers not being able to do their work to the fullest potential because of lack of encouragement.

Distractions
Though working in an office has its distractions, it is often argued that remote work involves even greater distractions. According to one study, children are ranked as the number one distractions, followed by spouses, pets, neighbors, and solicitors. The lack of proper tools and facilities also serves as a major distraction, though this can be mitigated by using short-term coworking rental facilities. Also, some countries such as Romania have tasked the national labour inspectorate the burden of carrying out checks at remote workers’ residences to see if the work environment meets the requirements. Workers might not be effective at there job because of the lack of monitoring hence they would be more tempted to do other things during work hours causing them not to do their work effectively.

Boundaries between work and non-work spheres may be gendered 
A survey study on couples working from home during the COVID-19 pandemic found that female workers with children in their household perceived the home office environment as significantly more exhausting, suffered longer working hours and blurred boundaries than male workers and female workers without children in their household. Women without children in their household experienced mainly positive consequences for working due to better concentration.

Employee pressure to be seen as valuable 
Remote workers may feel pressure to produce more output in order to be seen as valuable, and reduce the idea that they are doing less work than others. This pressure to produce output, as well as a lack of social support from limited coworker relationships and feelings of isolation, leads to lower job engagement in remote workers. Additionally, higher-quality relationships with teammates decreased job satisfaction of remote workers, potentially because of frustrations with exchanging interactions via technology. However, coworker support and virtual social groups for team building had a direct influence on increasing job satisfaction, perhaps due to an increase in skill variety from teamwork and an increase in task significance from more working relationships.

The inconsistent findings regarding remote work and satisfaction may be explained by a more complicated relationship. Presumably because of the effects of autonomy, initial job satisfaction increases as the amount of remote work increases; however, as remote work increases, declines in feedback and task significance lead job satisfaction to level off and decrease slightly. Thus, the amount of remote work influences the relationship between remote work and job satisfaction. Barriers to the continued growth of remote work include distrust from employers and personal disconnectedness for employees.

Working in the office with other workers could increase the potential of the worker.

Challenges to team building; focus on the individual
Communication and getting to know other teammates happen naturally when everyone works in the same space, so with remote work, employees and supervisors have to work harder to maintain relationships with co-workers. This is especially important for new employees so that they learn organizational habits even when working remotely.

Three of the five job attributes: skill variety, task identity, and task significance, influence how much employees think their jobs are meaningful. Skill variety is the degree of activities and skills that a job requires in order to complete a task. An increase in skill variety is thought to increase the challenge of the job. Increasing the challenge of the job increases the individual's experienced meaningfulness, how much the individual cares about work, and finds it worthwhile. Remote work may not directly affect skill variety and task meaningfulness for the individual compared to when he or she worked in an office; however, skill variety and meaningfulness of individual tasks can increase when working in a group. If the work done at home is focused on the individual rather than the team, there may be fewer opportunities to use a variety of skills.

Task identity is the degree that the individual sees work from beginning to end or completes an identifiable or whole piece of work rather than only a small piece. Task significance is the degree that the individual feels his or her work has a substantial impact on the lives or work of other people within the organization or outside the organization. Remote work may not change the job characteristics of skill variety, task identity, and task significance compared to working in an office; however, the presence of these characteristics will influence remote workers' work outcomes and attitudes.

In his book, "Together: The Healing Power Of Human Connection In A Sometimes Lonely World,” U.S. Surgeon General Vivek Murthy asserts that face-to-face meetings, in-person collaboration, and "micro-moments" of community at work are what give people the essential feeling of belongingness and being part of a team.

Isolation and mental health
Research by Julianne Holt-Lunstad, a psychologist and professor at Brigham Young University, showed the most important predictor of living a long life is social integration.

A study by researchers at the University of Chicago showed that routine interactions with people benefits mental health.

In a 2018 study, Sigal G. Barsade, an organizational behavior professor at the Wharton School of the University of Pennsylvania, found that lonelier employees feel less committed to their employers and also to their co-workers.

Isolation due to remote work also hinders formation of friendships.

Although several scholars and managers had previously expressed fears that employee careers might suffer and workplace relationships might be damaged because of remote work, a 2007 study found that there are no generally detrimental effects on the quality of workplace relationships and career outcomes. Remote work actually was found to positively affect employee-supervisor relations and the relationship between job satisfaction and turnover intent was in part due to supervisor relationship quality. Only high-intensity remote work (where employees work from home for more than 2.5 days a week) harmed employee relationships with co-workers, even though it did reduce work-family conflict.

Individuals may differ in their reactions to the job characteristics in remote work. According to job characteristics theory, the personal need for accomplishment and development ("growth need strength") influences how much an individual will react to the job dimensions of remote work. For instance, those individuals high in "growth need strength" will have a more positive reaction to increased autonomy and a more negative reaction to decreased feedback in remote work than those individuals low in "growth need strength".

A 2021 report from Prudential found that the majority of people prefer the hybrid model, and that two in three workers believe in-person interactions are important for career growth. The report also found that fully remote workers felt less entitled to take a vacation and believed they must be available around the clock. One in four workers felt isolated, and reported this as a major challenge. Ultimately, most workers want flexibility but do not want to give up the benefits available from working in-person with colleagues.

Information security
Employees need training, tools, and technologies for remote work. Remote work poses cybersecurity risks and people should follow best practices that include using antivirus software, keeping family members away from work devices, covering their webcams, using a VPN, using a centralized storage solution, making sure passwords are strong and secure, and being wary of email scams and email security.

In 2021, Vermont, South Carolina, South Dakota, Alabama, and Nebraska were named as the top 5 safest states for remote workers based on data breaches, stolen records, privacy laws, victim count, and victim loss.

A 2020 survey of over 1,000 remote workers showed that 59% of employees felt more cyber secure working in-office compared to at home.

Technology or equipment issues 
Employees having inadequate equipment or technology can prevent work from getting done. A FlexJobs survey found 28% had technical problems and 26% reported WI-FI issues.

Loss of control by management
Additionally, remote work may not always be seen positively by management due to fear of loss of managerial control.

A study found that managers had a bias again employees who did not work in the office. Manager attributed the amount of time they saw an employee in the office more than the work than the contribution that was made.

Alleged drop in worker productivity
There have been conflicting data on the correlation between remote work and productivity. Some studies have found that remote work increases worker productivity and leads to higher supervisor ratings of performance and higher performance appraisals. However, another study found that professional isolation in remote workers led to a decrease in job performance, especially for those who spent more time remote working and engaged in fewer face-to-face interactions. Thus, similar to job attitudes, the amount of time spent remote working may also influence the relationship between remote work and job performance.

There may be a drop in remote worker productivity, which could be due to inadequate office setup.

However, surveys found that over two-thirds of employers reported increased productivity among remote workers.

Traditional line managers are accustomed to managing by observation and not necessarily by results. This causes a serious obstacle in organizations attempting to adopt remote work. Liability and workers' compensation can become serious issues as well.

A 2008 study found that more time spent remote working decreased the perception of productivity of the remote worker by management.

Jealousy in the workplace
Workers who do not have remote work privileges may be jealous of those who do, leading to workplace controversies.

Taxation complexity
Working remotely in a different jurisdiction than the employer can have tax implications that are not fully understood by remote workers.

Health impacts due to increased hours working
According to a 2021 report by the World Health Organization and the International Labour Organization, remote work could potentially increase health loss among workers if it increases working time to over 55 hours per week.

Negative aspects of remote work 
Some negative aspects related to working from home are the separation of the work-life balance, the misreading of social cues electronically, and need to self motivate. Workers have found that job hours are not well defined and the distinction between homelife and worklife become very unclear. It is hard to interpret tone in an electronic communication, therefore some miscommunications occur.  When working from home employees have to inspire themselves to get the tasks completed. Utilizing time management tools to complete assignments within the prescribed period of time.

Remote work during COVID-19 
The extensive use of remote work under COVID-19 constituted a major organizational transformation. However, the implementation of remote work during COVID-19 was hurried, and new technologies and operating systems have had to be implemented without previous testing or training. Organisations reported concerns about losses in culture and productivity whilst workers were more concerned about declines in social interactions, internet connectivity and increased workload. Additionally, 25% of remote-working Americans were resistant to employer mandates to return to in-office work.

The remote work arrangement during COVID-19 is better for higher-paid and higher-management personnel in terms of productivity and reported well-being, whereas individuals at the bottom end of the earning spectrum experience reduced remuneration.

Remote work arrangement during COVID-19 has an impact on employees' financial stability and reduces social connection. According to study, the inability to meet financial obligations and maintain social relationships considerably increases reported family stress and domestic violence, as well as women's bargaining power; yet, obtaining financial help does not mitigate the issue.

Utility bills increased during the COVID-19 pandemic in an inconsistent manner. Utility bills for minorities and lower income individuals were more likely to increase because they lived in housing that was older, with less effective insulation and without energy efficient appliances. The increase in electricity also came due to the people using their utilities at different times of the day.

See also

 
 
Comparisons
 
 
 
 
 
 Coworking – people working independently sharing a common working area
 Digital nomad – someone that works remotely while traveling and living a nomadic lifestyle
 Distributed company - a company where all employees are physically distributed and engage in remote work
 
 
 Distributed workforce – the conduct of organizational tasks in places that extend beyond the confines of traditional offices or workspaces
 Desktop virtualization – the ability to access legacy applications or operating systems from a remote device
 
 
 
 
 
 Homeshoring – In British English, when the initiative comes from the company, the terms "homeshoring" and "homesourcing" are sometimes used.
 
 Hoteling – Some companies, particularly those where employees spend a great deal of time on the road and at remote locations, offer a hotdesking or hoteling arrangement where employees can reserve the use of a temporary traditional office, cubicle or meeting room at the company headquarters, a remote office center, or other shared office facility.
 
 
 
 
 
 
 
 
 
 
 
 
 
 
 
 
 
 Work at home scheme – get-rich-quick schemes in which a victim is lured by an offer to be employed at home, very often doing some simple task in a minimal amount of time with a large amount of income that exceeds the market rate for the type of work
 
 Zoom town – a community that is popular for remote workers.

References

Further reading
John O'Duinn, (2018) Distributed Teams: The Art and Practice of Working Together While Physically Apart', 
 Thomas L. Friedman, 'The World is Flat: A Brief History of the Twenty-First Century''. 2005

External links
 
 
 

Working time
Working conditions